Alyson Stephanie Court (born November 9, 1973) is a Canadian actress. Beginning her career as a child actress, her first role was on the series Mr. Dressup (1984–1994) and she made her film debut in Sesame Street Presents: Follow That Bird (1985). Court continued to appear in educational productions, landing the lead role of Loonette the Clown on the series The Big Comfy Couch (1992–2002).

As a voice actress, Court has appeared in several animated series, mostly notably as Lydia Deetz in Beetlejuice (1989–1991) and Jubilee in X-Men (1992–1997). She was also the original voice of Claire Redfield in the Resident Evil franchise, voicing the character for all of her appearances from Resident Evil 2 (1998) to Resident Evil: Operation Raccoon City (2012).

Television roles
Court first appeared in the Canadian children's series as herself in Mr. Dressup in 1984 and later with Big Bird in the 1985 film Sesame Street Presents: Follow That Bird. In 1988, she was in the pilot for the series My Secret Identity as Caroline, neighbor to Jerry O'Connell's character. Court played Loonette the Clown, the main character of the series The Big Comfy Couch, for the first six seasons before leaving the show to focus on raising her child.

From 2000 to 2003, Court was the host of the morning children's programming block on CBC, Get Set for Life (now CBC Kids).

Voice acting
Court voiced summer camper Dawn in the 1986 animated film Care Bears Movie II: A New Generation and Emily Elizabeth in the Clifford's Fun with... videotape series from 1988 to the early 1990s. Among her animated series voice acting roles are Malani the Ewok in the animated television program Star Wars: Ewoks, and Lydia Deetz (originally played by Winona Ryder) in the animated adaptation of the 1988 film Beetlejuice. She voiced Terri Cloth on The Garbage Pail Kids animated series of 1987–1988. In 1992, she voiced Jubilee in X-Men: The Animated Series and Nora Mouse in the animated series Timothy Goes to School. She was also voice of Trina Riffin in the Cartoon Network/Teletoon series Grojband, Queen Martha in the Nick Jr. program Mike the Knight and Poodle in the YTV program Almost Naked Animals. During 2006 and 2007, she was the voice of Dahlia in the animated series Skyland. She voices Coco in the animated show Urban Vermin, and was the voice of Pixx in the animated show Ultraforce. Also she voiced of Windy Woo from The Naughty Naughty Pets.

In video games, she provided the voice of Claire Redfield in Resident Evil 2, Resident Evil – Code: Veronica, Resident Evil: Degeneration, Resident Evil: The Darkside Chronicles,<ref>Talking Evil – Claire's Presence </ref> and Resident Evil: Operation Raccoon City. Court did not reprise her role as Claire in Resident Evil: Revelations 2 or the 2019 remake of Resident Evil 2, as the third-party localization team overseeing voice acting and motion capture chose to go with non-union voice actors. In addition she directed the voice-over and motion-capture portions of the spin-off title Resident Evil Outbreak, which did not feature Claire. In addition to voice acting, Court was also involved in the localization process of several Capcom games in North America. Among the most worthy were Mega Man X5 in 2001, in which she was directly responsible for the decision to rename the initial eight Maverick bosses to reference Guns N' Roses members, meant as a tribute for her then husband's love for the band. In 1998, Court reprised her role as Jubilee in Marvel vs. Capcom: Clash of Super Heroes.
Court also provided the voice of Arkayna Goodfey / Mysticon Dragon Mage in the Nickelodeon/YTV series Mysticons''.

Personal life
Court was previously married to Erik Suzuki, a former Capcom voice and video game localization director. Court has a son named Blaede, born in January 2003. In March 2018, Court became engaged to comic book creator Z.M. Thomas. On July 1, 2019, Court announced her marriage to Thomas.

Filmography

Film

Television

Video games

References

External links

1973 births
Canadian casting directors
Women casting directors
Canadian child actresses
Canadian film actresses
Canadian television actresses
Canadian video game actresses
Canadian voice actresses
Canadian voice directors
Living people
Actresses from Los Angeles
20th-century Canadian actresses
21st-century Canadian actresses